John Molina Jr. (born December 28, 1982) is an American former professional boxer who competed from 2006 to 2019. He challenged twice for world titles; the WBC lightweight title in 2012 and the unified WBC and WBO light welterweight titles in 2016.

Professional career
On April 24, 2010 in the HBO undercard of Chris Arreola vs Tomasz Adamek, Molina beat veteran Jose Antonio Izquierdo by second round K.O.

He fought against undefeated Henry Lundy on ESPN's Friday Night Fights for the WBO NABO Lightweight Championship. During the fight with Lundy, Molina would pressure him and would knockout the Philadelphia fighter in the eleventh round.

In May 2011, John stopped the tough veteran Alejandro Rodríguez to win the vacant WBC USNBC Lightweight Championship with his next fight was a T.K.O. victory on ESPN against Robert Frankel.

After knocking out Dannie Williams in another Friday Night Fights appearance in January 2013, Molina would lose to an undefeated Andrey Klimov by majority decision in June 2013.

After the Klimov loss, Molina fought unbeaten Cleveland lightweight Mickey Bey on the main event of a Mayweather Promotions card broadcast on ShoBox from Hard Rock Casino in Las Vegas on Friday, July 19, 2013. Bey controlled most of the bout up until the 10th and final round, in which Molina hurt Bey with a left hook, and then continued to pound him with hard shots until referee Vic Drakulich stepped in to call a halt to the bout at 2:01 of the 10th round. This round is to be considered by many round of the year for 2013.

Molina was defeated by Adrien Broner via unanimous decision in the first episode of  the Premier Boxing Champions series of fights on NBC.

First world title shot
On September 8, 2012, John Molina Jr. got his first world title shot, in a bout against Mexican Antonio DeMarco for the WBC lightweight title. Immediately, Molina was tagged and hurt by a straight left hand from DeMarco, the first shot DeMarco landed. Molina covered up in his corner as DeMarco pelted him until Referee Jack Reiss called a halt to the bout. The end came before 44 seconds had passed in the first round, handing Molina his second career loss. The stoppage would not come without protest where
Molina Jr was sitting on the ropes during this time and was expecting to get a standing eight count.

Second world title shot 
On December 10, 2016, Molina Jr fought Terence Crawford for the WBC, WBO and The Ring light welterweight titles. Crawford dominated throughout the fight. In the eighth round, Crawford hurt Molina Jr badly with a body shot, which made Molina Jr backtrack, and paved the way for a finish for Crawford. Crawford was hitting Molina Jr from all sides which made the referee stop the fight.

Molina Jr bounced back in his next fight, against Ivan Redkach. Molina Jr once agan was a part of a very entertaining fight. After he got dropped in the second round by Redkach, Molina Jr returned the favor, once in the third and once in the fourth round. The referee stopped the fight in the fourth, with 1:27 left on the clock.

In his next fight, Molina Jr faced Omar Figueroa Jr. Figureoa Jr outperfmored Molina Jr, and controlled the pace for most of the fight with his superior jab. All three judges had scored the fight comfortably in favor of Figueroa Jr, 99-91, 98-92 and 97-93.

On September 28, 2019, Molina Jr battled former world title challenger Josesito Lopez. Lopez dropped Molina Jr twice in the opening round, and controlled most of the opening rounds of the fight. Molina Jr showed some fight during the middle rounds, but Lopez managed to drop him for the third time in the seventh round. As Molina Jr looked hurt, the referee informed him that the first clean shot he takes in the following rounds, would mean an end to the fight. That is exactly what happened in the eighth, and Lopez was awarded the eighth-round TKO win.

Professional boxing record

References

External links

John Molina Jr - Profile, News Archive & Current Rankings at Box.Live

American boxers of Mexican descent
Doping cases in boxing
Lightweight boxers
1982 births
Living people
American male boxers
Light-welterweight boxers
People from Covina, California
Boxers from California